Psilocybe fagicola is a species of psychedelic mushroom in the family Hymenogastraceae native to Mexico.  The type specimen for the species was collected in 1959 in a beech forest in Hidalgo, Mexico.

See also
List of Psilocybe species
List of Psilocybin mushrooms
Psilocybe

References

External links

Entheogens
Psychoactive fungi
fagicola
Psychedelic tryptamine carriers
Fungi described in 1959
Fungi of North America